Izobilny (masculine), Izobilnaya (feminine), or Izobilnoye (neuter) is the name of several inhabited localities in Russia.

Modern localities
Urban localities
Izobilny, Stavropol Krai, a town in Izobilnensky District of Stavropol Krai

Rural localities
Izobilny, Krasnodar Krai, a settlement in Novoumansky Rural Okrug of Leningradsky District of Krasnodar Krai
Izobilny, Rostov Oblast, a khutor in Yegorlykskoye Rural Settlement of Yegorlyksky District of Rostov Oblast
Izobilnoye, Kaliningrad Oblast, a settlement in Saransky Rural Okrug of Polessky District of Kaliningrad Oblast
Izobilnoye, Krasnodar Krai, a selo in Rudyevsky Rural Okrug of Otradnensky District of Krasnodar Krai
Izobilnoye, Orenburg Oblast, a selo in Izobilny Selsoviet of Sol-Iletsky District of Orenburg Oblast

Renamed localities
Izobilnoye, until 1965, the name of Izobilny, a town in Izobilnensky District of Stavropol Krai